In the early years of Christianity, the Church Fathers commented extensively on numerology. 

The Fathers repeatedly condemned the magical use of numbers which had descended from Babylonian sources to the Pythagoreans and Gnostics of their times. They denounced any system of philosophy which rested upon an exclusively numerical basis. Even so, they almost unanimously regarded the numbers of Holy Writ as full of mystical meaning, and they considered the interpretation of these mystical meanings as an important branch of exegesis. There was reluctance in the Christian teachers of the early centuries to push this recognition of the significance of numbers to extremes.

Irenaeus

Irenaeus explains the number of the beast 666 (Apoc., xiii, 18) by adding the numerical value of each "Greek letter" in the names "Evanthas" (Ευανθας), "Lateinos" (Λατεινος), and "Teitan" (Τειταν).  The constituent of all the Greek letters yields the total:

Irenaeus also discusses at length the Gnostic numerical interpretation of the holy name "Jesus" as the equivalent of 888, and he claims that by writing the name in Hebrew characters an entirely different interpretation is necessitated.

Ambrose
St. Ambrose commenting upon the days of creation and the Sabbath remarks, 

The number seven is good, but we do not explain it after the doctrine of Pythagoras and the other philosophers, but rather according to the manifestation and division of the grace of the Spirit; for the prophet Isaias has enumerated the principal gifts of the Holy Spirit as seven
— Letter to Horontianus

Augustine
Augustine of Hippo, replying to Tichonius the Donatist, observes that 

if Tichonius had said that these mystical rules open out some of the hidden recesses of the law, instead of saying that they reveal all the mysteries of the law, he would have spoken truth

Influence of Biblical texts
Influenced mainly by Biblical precepts, the Fathers down to the time of Bede and even later gave much attention to the sacredness and mystical significance not only of certain numerals in themselves but also of the numerical totals given by the constituent letters with which words were written. An example is in the early Epistle of Barnabas. This document appeals to The Book of Genesis as mystically pointing to the name and self-oblation of the coming Messias. 

"Learn, therefore," says the writer, "that Abraham who first appointed circumcision, looked forward in spirit unto Jesus when he circumcised, having received the ordinances of three letters. For the Scripture saith, And Abraham circumcised of his household eighteen males and three hundred.' What then was the knowledge given unto him? Understand ye that He saith the eighteen' first, and then after an interval three hundred.' In the [number] eighteen [the Greek IOTA] stands for 10, [the Greek ETA] for eight. Here thou hast Jesus ([in Greek] IESOUS). And because the cross in the [Greek TAU] was to have grace, he saith also three hundred.' So he revealeth Jesus in two letters and in the remaining one the cross". 

Here the numerical value of the Greek letters iota and eta, the first letters of the Holy Name, is 10 and 8, for 18, while Tau, which stands for the form of the cross, represents 300.

See also
 Biblical numerology
 Marcosians
 Significance of numbers in Judaism

Citations

General references 
 Attribution
 

Esoteric Christianity
Language and mysticism
Numerology